Kunal Kamra (born 3 October 1988) is an Indian standup comedian known for his observational comedy about absurdities of life. His performances include jokes about politics, cabbies, bachelor life and TV advertisements.

Early life and education
Kamra was born and brought up in Mumbai. He attended Jai Hind College for a degree in Commerce. He dropped out in his second year to start working as a production assistant in Prasoon Pandey's ad film production house Corcoise Films, where he worked for eleven years.

Career
He started performing as a stand-up comedian in 2013, with a gig at the Canvas Laugh Club in Mumbai. A clip of one of his gigs, uploaded on YouTube in 2017, lead to him receiving death threats for his satirical take on Indian hyper-nationalism. He started his eponymous titled web-series Shut Up Ya Kunal in July 2017 along with Ramit Verma. The episodes typically feature a conversation with one or more invited guests, interposed with clips of news segments or debates, edited for humour. His best performances include jokes about cabbies, bachelor life and ridiculous TV advertisements.

On 1 March 2017, he released a comedy video titled "Patriotism and the Government" on YouTube mocking the Indian banknote demonetization, the government and the attitude of Indians towards the army. He received several death threats for uploading the video. In 2018, he shared that he was asked by his landlady to vacate the premise due to "political issues".

Shut Up Ya Kunal 
In 2017, Kunal launched a YouTube podcast titled Shut Up Ya Kunal along with his friend Ramit Verma. The show features Kamra engaged in an informal discussion with politicians and activists from both ends of the spectrum. The videos are interspersed with news clips of the guests contradicting their own statements to comic effect. Ramit Verma of the satirical Facebook page PeeingHuman is the show's creative director and editor. The first episode aired on 20 July 2017 and featured Madhukeshwar Desai, the vice-president of the Bharatiya Janata Party's youth wing. The episode featuring JNU students Kanhaiya Kumar and Umar Khalid reached around a million views within hours of release.

Controversies

Incident on IndiGo flight 
On 28 January 2020, Kamra, while travelling on an IndiGo flight, confronted the news presenter Arnab Goswami, inviting him to debate with him. Kamra had raised questions about Goswami's coverage of issues on national affairs and the suicide of Rohith Vemula. Kamra later released a 1.51-minute long video of the incident on Twitter, which showed a non-responsive Goswami while being questioned by him. The next day, Indigo banned Kamra from boarding its flights for a period of six months. The same day, government-owned airline Air India banned him indefinitely. India's aviation minister, Hardeep Singh Puri, tweeted that other airlines should follow suit and ban Kamra to ensure that an example was set. The next day, SpiceJet and GoAir also banned him indefinitely. The ban was criticized for being excessive and against the rules of the Directorate General of Civil Aviation.

Filmmaker Anurag Kashyap refused to fly with IndiGo due to their decision to ban Kamra. Two IndiGo passengers also protested and displayed placards on a plane in support of Kamra.

On 11 September 2022, after his comedy shows were cancelled in Gurgaon, Kamra wrote an open letter addressed to the Vishva Hindu Parishad (VHP). He challenged VHP to condemn Mahatma Gandhi's assassin Nathuram Godse.

Accusations of contempt of court 
After Republic TV editor-in-chief Arnab Goswami was granted interim bail by the Supreme Court on 11 November 2020, Kamra made a series of tweets critical of the Supreme Court. Eight people accused Kamra of contempt of court and sued him. The Attorney General K. K. Venugopal gave his mandatory approval to initiate contempt proceedings related to the tweets. Kamra said he continued to believe that "the silence of the Supreme Court of India on matters of other's personal liberty cannot go uncriticised." He does not intend to retract the tweets nor apologise for them. He asked that the time that may be allotted for hearing his contempt case should be spent on more important cases pending before the court.

Filmography

List of Shut Up Ya Kunal Episodes

Other Works

References

External links 
 

Indian comedians
1988 births
Living people
Indian YouTubers
People from Mumbai
Jai Hind College alumni
YouTube channels launched in 2017